The Rome Porta San Paolo Railway Park Museum is a museum in Rome (Italy), concerned with railway and tram transportation. It is housed next to the Roma Porta San Paolo railway station and the Piramide station of the metro (line B).

General 
The museum, inaugurated on 18 September 2004, is in part in the open, where the restored rolling stock can be seen, and in part indoors, where scale models, devices and technical objects are displayed, providing a full outline of the history of public rail  transport in the Rome area.

Rolling stock 
The rolling stock examples kept in the museum include:
 Locomotive Breda AEG, year 1915, s.n. 01 STEFER from the Rome–Fiuggi railway.
 Locomotive Carminati-Toselli TIBB, year 1922, s.n. 05 STEFER from the Rome–Lido railway.
 Electric locomotive ECD "Officine Meccaniche della Stanga" TIBB, year 1931, s.n. 21 from the Rome–Civitacastellana–Viterbo railway.
 Tram STFER series 400, s.n. 404 "Officine Meccaniche della Stanga" TIBB, year 1941, from the Tramvie dei Castelli Romani.
 Tram STEFER, s.n. 70, from the extra-urban service on the Castelli Romani lines.
 STEFER, flat service wagon obtained by modifying a former extra-urban two-axle trailer.
 Power trolley STEFER used for inspections on the Rome–Fiuggi railway.

Photo gallery

Connections 
  Piramide station, Line B.

External links 
The museum centre of ATAC SpA website, with a description of the exhibits.
 

Museums in Rome
Railway museums in Italy
Tram museums
2004 establishments in Italy